The European Athlete of the Month is an award that can be won by athletes participating in events within the sport of athletics organised by the European Athletic Association (EAA). The election has been organised since 2007.

Winners

Multiwinners (4+)
Men
  Renaud Lavillenie (pole vault) – 11 wins
  Jakob Ingebrigtsen (middle distance, cross country) – 7 wins
  Karsten Warholm (400m, 400m hurdles) – 7 wins
  Ivan Ukhov (high jump) – 6 wins
  Bohdan Bondarenko (high jump) – 5 wins
  Serhiy Lebid (cross country, marathon) – 4 wins

Women
  Jessica Ennis-Hill (heptathlon) – 7 wins
  Katerina Stefanidi (pole vault) – 6 wins
  Blanka Vlašić (high jump) – 6 wins
  Barbora Špotáková (javelin throw) – 5 wins
  Elvan Abeylegesse (5000m, 10,000m) – 4 wins
  Ana Dulce Felix (distance running - cross, road, track) – 4 wins
  Yelena Isinbayeva (pole vault) – 4 wins
  Dafne Schippers (100m, 200m) – 4 wins
  Ivana Španović (long jump) – 4 wins

See also
 European Athlete of the Year

References

External links
 EAA website

Sport of athletics awards
European awards
European Athletic Association awards